Khottabych (Hottabych) is a 2006 Russian fantasy comedy film by STV Film Company. It is based on the novel The Copper Jar of Old Khottabych by Sergey Oblomov, and uses the title character, genie Khottabych, created by Soviet writer Lazar Lagin for his children's book and movie Old Khottabych (1956). The film has the screen name K}{OTT@B\)CH, underscoring the film's Internet motif. It opened in theaters on 10 August 2006 at Karoprokat.

Plot 
A youth named Gena is a hacker hooked on computers and the Internet. His girlfriend is fed up with him, because he pays so little attention to her and so much to his electronic exploits, such as defacing the www.microsoft.com web site.

Attempting to mend his relationship with his girlfriend, he buys an ancient jar from an Internet-auction and finds a genie residing in it. Per the fairy-tale tradition, he is offered three wishes. First, the genie, named Hottabych by Gena, prints a huge number of US$100 banknotes. Unfortunately Hottabych is not familiar with modern paper, and the banknotes are printed on Egyptian papyrus. This later sets off a chain of events leading back to Gena.

Unbeknownst to him, the local mafia is aware of Gena's skills and is intent on forcing him to gain entrance to bank computers. Furthermore, the Russian and American police forces are attempting to locate him because of his recent activity on the Internet. The Americans send a female hacker named Annie to trick Gena into revealing himself, which he does. After a rocky start to their relationship, romance ensues.

Things are further complicated by an evil genie named Shaitanych who is also hunting for the jar, in an attempt to collect all 13 genie-vessels and gain dominion over Earth, so no dreams may be ever fulfilled (he names this "The Greatest Worldwide Bummer"). After Hottabych grants Gena's final wish, he decides to become a mortal man and is subsequently killed by Shaitanych. Left with nothing but a strand of Hottabych's hair, Gena and Annie decode his DNA and upload the binary code into the Internet, where a final battle takes place between Hottabych and Shaitanych.

Cast 
 Khottabych as Vladimir Tolokonnikov
 Gena as Marius Jampolskis
 Annie as Līva Krūmiņa
 Shaytanych as Mark Geykhman
 Lena as Julia Paranova

 Alisa Sezeneova as Mila Lipner
Venick as Grigory Skryapnik
 Oleg as Alexander Ovchinnikov
Alexander as Yuriy Dumchev
 
Employees of FSB Konstantin Spassky and Rostislav Krokhin

Features 
 The film features modern youth culture, including IRC and the computer game Counter-Strike.

Music score, lyrics, songs 
 "Pochuty", "Super-puper", "Beta-karotin", "Gajki s Jamajki" by Boombox music group;
 "Spionskaya" - Spy theme music by Dmytro Shurov;
 "The Number" by Psoy Korolenko;
 "Cloun" written by T. Kosonen, A. Korvumak, T. Leppanen; performed by Aavikko;
 "Vladimirskij central" by Mikhail Krug;
 "Amerika" by Mnogotochie;
 "Sljuna", "Sljuna", "Shajtan Shajtanych" by Uratsakidogi;
 "Morjak" by Artjom Rukavichkin;
 "Kukla kolduna" by Korol' i Shut.

Trivia 

 The car used by the main characters is a modified Pobeda M20. It was sold on Internet auction Molotok.ru for $10,000.
 The off-screen voice is Dmitry Puchkov known as Goblin.
 Filmed at Russian State Genetic Scientific Research Institute. The device used by Gena is really used in the process of DNA analysis.
 In the scene shot at the Red Square, extras dressed up as Russian police officers stood around the perimeter of the set to prevent strangers from entering it.
 In the episode where Gena is beaten by police officers, one of them missed actor Jampolskis' protective wear and hit actor with all his might.
 The movie uses nmap

Video release 
The film was released by Soyuz Video on VHS and DVD in August 2006 without subtitles, and also on PAL DVD-editions by Karoprokat with subtitles and the trailer of the film. In the United States and Canada, it was released on VHS and DVD without subtitles and with English simultaneous interpretation on system NTSC in September.

The aspect ratio of the movie is 16:9 (1.85:1).

References

External links 

 Trailer and Screenshots

2006 films
2000s fantasy comedy films
2000s Russian-language films
Films based on Russian novels
Russian fantasy comedy films